Periyar Bus Stand is a central bus terminus for local city buses in Madurai in Tamil Nadu, India. The bus stand is one of the key bus terminus in Madurai. It is centrally located in the Madurai city.

History 
The Central bus stand was originally opened in the year 1921 and it was later renamed to Periyar Bus stand (current) in the 1970s. This bus stand has been completely demolished and is being reconstructed since January 17, 2019 with a project budget of 153 crore rupees.

Services 
 Bus bay
Shops
Two wheeler parking
Four wheeler parking

Facilities 
The newly constructed bus stand will have all facilities.It will be opened on 8th December 2021 as a part of the Smart Cities Mission

Connections
The terminus is well connected to various parts of the city such as:
Meenakshi Amman Temple(Melavasal-West Tower) - 1.4 km
MGR Bus Stand - 8.1km
Arappalayam Bus Terminus - 3.6km
Madurai Junction-0.4km
Thirumalai Nayakkar Mahal-1.9km
Thiruparankundram Temple-6.5km
Madurai Airport-11.6km
AIIMS Madurai-23.1km

See also 
 Transport in Madurai
 Madurai Junction
 Madurai International Airport

References 

Bus stations in Madurai